In mathematics, the Nagata conjecture on curves, named after Masayoshi Nagata, governs the minimal degree required for a plane algebraic curve to pass through a collection of very general points with prescribed multiplicities.

History
Nagata arrived at the conjecture via work on the 14th problem of Hilbert, which asks whether the invariant ring of a linear group action on the polynomial ring  over some field  is finitely generated. Nagata published the conjecture in a 1959 paper in the American Journal of Mathematics, in which he presented a counterexample to Hilbert's 14th problem.

Statement
Nagata Conjecture. Then for  any curve  in  that passes through each of the points  with multiplicity  must satisfy

In the case where , the cone theorem essentially gives a complete description of the cone of curves of the blow-up of the plane.

Current status
The only case when this is known to hold is when  is a perfect square, which was proved by Nagata. Despite much interest, the other cases remain open.  A more modern formulation of this conjecture is often given in terms of Seshadri constants and has been generalised to other surfaces under the name of the Nagata–Biran conjecture.

References
.
.
.

Algebraic curves
Conjectures